Daniel Wroughton Craig  (born 2 March 1968) is an English actor. He gained international fame playing the secret agent James Bond in five installments in the film series, from Casino Royale (2006) up to No Time to Die (2021).

After training at the National Youth Theatre in London and graduating from the Guildhall School of Music and Drama in 1991, Craig began his career on stage. He began acting with the drama The Power of One (1992), and had his breakthrough role in the drama serial Our Friends in the North (1996). He gained prominence for his supporting roles in films such as Elizabeth (1998), Lara Croft: Tomb Raider (2001), Road to Perdition (2002), Layer Cake (2004), and Munich (2005).

In 2006, Craig played Bond in Casino Royale, a reboot of the Bond franchise which was favourably received by critics and earned Craig a nomination for the BAFTA Award for Best Actor in a Leading Role. His non-Bond appearances since then include roles in the fantasy film The Golden Compass (2007), the drama Defiance (2008), the science fiction Western Cowboys & Aliens (2011), the mystery thriller The Girl with the Dragon Tattoo (2011), and the heist film Logan Lucky (2017). For his performance as Detective Benoit Blanc in the comedy mystery films Knives Out (2019) and Glass Onion (2022), he received two Golden Globe Award nominations.

In 2011, Craig made his Broadway debut in the revival of Harold Pinter's Betrayal opposite his wife, the actress Rachel Weisz. In 2016, he starred in the New York Theatre Workshop production of Othello as Iago. In 2022, he returned to Broadway in the title role of Macbeth with Ruth Negga.

Early life 
Daniel Wroughton Craig was born in Chester, Cheshire on 2 March 1968, the son of an art teacher, Carol Olivia (née Williams), and Timothy John Wroughton Craig, a midshipman in the Merchant Navy and steel erector. His father later became the landlord of two Cheshire pubs: the Ring o' Bells in Frodsham and the Boot Inn in Tarporley. Craig has an older sister named Lea (born 1965). He is of part Welsh and distant French descent, counting the French Huguenot minister Daniel Chamier and Sir William Burnaby, 1st Baronet among his ancestors. His middle name, Wroughton, comes from his great-great-grandmother, Grace Matilda Wroughton.

When Craig's parents divorced in 1972, he and his sister moved to the Wirral Peninsula with their mother, where he attended primary school in Hoylake as well as school in Frodsham. He attended Hilbre High School in West Kirby. Upon leaving there at the age of 16, he attended Calday Grange Grammar School as a sixth form student. He played rugby union for Hoylake RFC.

Craig began acting in school plays at the age of six, making his debut in the Frodsham Primary School production of Oliver! He became interested in serious acting by attending Liverpool's Everyman Theatre with his mother. At the age of 14 in 1982, he played roles in Romeo and Juliet and Cinderella at Hilbre High School. In 1984, he was accepted into the National Youth Theatre and moved to London, where he worked part-time in restaurants to finance his education. His parents watched his stage debut as Agamemnon in Troilus And Cressida. He performed with the National Youth Theatre on tours to Valencia and Moscow under the leadership of director Edward Wilson. He entered the Guildhall School of Music and Drama in 1988, and graduated in 1991 after a three-year course under the tutelage of Colin McCormack, an actor from the Royal Shakespeare Company.

Career

1992–2005: Early roles and breakthrough

Craig appeared in his first screen role in 1992, playing an Afrikaner in The Power of One. Having played minor roles in the miniseries Anglo-Saxon Attitudes and the shows Covington Cross and Boon, he appeared in November 1993 as Joe in the Royal National Theatre's production of Tony Kushner's Angels in America. Also in 1993, Craig was featured in two episodes of the American television shows Zorro and The Young Indiana Jones Chronicles, and British shows Heartbeat, in which he played Peter Begg; Between the Lines; Drop the Dead Donkey and Sharpe's Eagle. In 1994, Craig appeared in The Rover, a filmed stage production and Les Grandes Horizontales, a stage production at the National Theatre Studio, where he first met Rachel Weisz, who would become his second wife. Craig was featured in the poorly received Disney film A Kid in King Arthur's Court (1995). In 1996, Craig starred in the BBC drama serial Our Friends in the North as the troubled George 'Geordie' Peacock. Appearing alongside Christopher Eccleston, Gina McKee and Mark Strong, Craig's part in the series is considered his breakthrough role.

In the same year, Craig guest-starred in an episode of the HBO horror anthology series Tales from the Crypt and was featured in the BBC television film Saint-Ex. Craig gave a lead performance in the Franco-German drama Obsession in 1997, about a love triangle between Craig's character and a couple. The same year, he played a leading role in Hurlyburly, a play performed in the West End at the Old Vic.

Craig appeared in three films in 1998: the independent drama Love and Rage, the biographical drama Elizabeth, in which he played Jesuit priest John Ballard, who was executed for being involved in the Babington Plot, an attempt to assassinate Queen Elizabeth I of England, and the BBC television film Love Is the Devil: Study for a Portrait of Francis Bacon (1998), in which Craig played small-time thief George Dyer who becomes the lover and muse of painter Francis Bacon, who was portrayed by Derek Jacobi. The following year, Craig starred in a television drama called Shockers: The Visitor and as Sergeant Telford Winter in the independent war film The Trench, which takes place in the confines of the trenches in the First World War during the 48 hours leading up to the Battle of the Somme.

Craig played a schizophrenic man who falls in love with a woman (played by Kelly Macdonald) after being discharged from psychiatric hospital in the drama Some Voices (2000). Also in 2000, Craig co-starred alongside Toni Collette in the dark comedy Hotel Splendide and was featured in I Dreamed of Africa, based on the life of Kuki Gallmann (played by Kim Basinger). Craig played the love interest of Angelina Jolie's character Lara Croft in Lara Croft: Tomb Raider (2001), based on the video game series Tomb Raider. He later admitted to having taken on the role in the poorly-reviewed yet commercially successful film only for the money. In 2001, Craig also starred in the four-part Channel 4 drama Sword of Honour, based on the trilogy of novels of the same. Craig appeared in the anthology film Ten Minutes Older: The Cello (2002), starring in the segment "Addicted to the Stars", directed by Michael Radford.

His second release of 2002 was Sam Mendes' crime film Road to Perdition with Tom Hanks and Paul Newman, in which he played Irish mobster Connor Rooney, the son of the crime organisation's boss. Craig then portrayed German theoretical physicist Werner Heisenberg in the BBC television drama Copenhagen (2002), which depicts Heisenberg's involvement in the German nuclear weapon project during World War II. On stage, Craig starred opposite Michael Gambon in the original production of Caryl Churchill's play A Number from September to November 2002 at the Royal Court Theatre. Craig received a London Evening Standard Theatre Award for Best Actor nomination for his role as a man who is cloned twice by his father. The next year, he starred as poet Ted Hughes opposite Gwyneth Paltrow as Sylvia Plath in the biographical film Sylvia (2003), which depicts the romance between the two poets. In the same year, he appeared in The Mother as a man who engages in an affair with the much older mother (played by Anne Reid) of his lover and best friend.

The crime thriller Layer Cake, directed by Matthew Vaughn, starred Craig as an unnamed London-based cocaine supplier known only as "XXXX" in the film's credits. Kevin Crust, writing for the Los Angeles Times, praised Craig's "stunningly suave performance", while Roger Ebert thought he was "fascinating" in the film. Craig next starred as a man who is stalked by a stranger (played by Rhys Ifans) after they witness a deadly accident together in Enduring Love (2004).

Craig appeared in three theatrical films in 2005, all of which were supporting roles. His first release of the year, was the thriller The Jacket starring Adrien Brody and Keira Knightley. He then made a brief appearance in the Hungarian film Fateless as a United States Army Sergeant who takes a liking to a teenage boy who survives life in concentration camps. Craig's third and final role of the year was in Munich, directed by Steven Spielberg, as a South African driver who is a part of a covert Israeli government assassination mission against 11 Palestinians allegedly involved in the Munich massacre at the 1972 Summer Olympics. Also in 2005, Craig starred in the BBC television film Archangel – based on Robert Harris' novel – as an English academic who stumbles upon a notebook believed to have belonged to Joseph Stalin.

2006–2021: James Bond and worldwide recognition

In 2005, Craig was contacted by Eon Productions to portray James Bond. Initially, he was unsure about the role and was resistant to the producers' overtures. "There was a period of trying to woo him" longtime Bond co-producer Barbara Broccoli later commented in 2012. During this period, he sought advice from colleagues and friends, of whom "most of us said to him...'there is life after Bond'.". He stated he "was aware of the challenges" of the Bond franchise, which he considered "a big machine that makes a lot of money". He aimed at bringing more "emotional depth" to the character. Born in 1968, Craig is the first actor to portray James Bond to have been born after the Bond series started and after the death of Ian Fleming, the novels' writer.

Craig's casting as Bond caused some controversy due to his physical appearance. Some fans considered the blond-haired, 5-foot-10-inch (1.78-metre) tall Craig to not fit the image of the taller, dark-haired Bond portrayed by the previous actors. Throughout the entire production period, Internet campaigns expressed their dissatisfaction and threatened to boycott the film in protest. Although the choice of Craig was controversial, numerous actors publicly voiced their support. Most notably four of the five actors who had previously portrayed Bond – Sean Connery, Roger Moore, Pierce Brosnan and Timothy Dalton – called his casting a good decision. Connery notably shared his thoughts on Craig's casting as Bond in 2008, describing him as "fantastic, marvelous in the part". The other actor to have previously played Bond, George Lazenby, has since voiced his approval of Craig, as well. Clive Owen, who had been linked to the role, also spoke in defence of Craig.

The first film, Casino Royale, premiered on 14 November 2006, and grossed US$594,239,066 worldwide, which made it the highest-grossing Bond film until the release of Skyfall. After the film was released, Craig's performance garnered critical acclaim. Craig lent his voice and likeness as James Bond for both the Wii game GoldenEye 007, an enhanced remake of the 1997 game for the Nintendo 64, and James Bond 007: Blood Stone. In addition to Casino Royale, Craig also appeared in two more films in 2006: the drama Infamous as mass murderer Perry Edward Smith and as the voice of the lead character in the English-language version of the French animated film Renaissance. In 2006, Craig was invited to join the Academy of Motion Picture Arts and Sciences.

Craig starred opposite Nicole Kidman in the science fiction horror film The Invasion in 2007, the fourth film adaptation of the novel The Body Snatchers by Jack Finney, which was met with a negative reception. He portrayed Lord Asriel in The Golden Compass, the 2007 film adaptation of Philip Pullman's novel. In March 2007, Craig made a cameo appearance as himself in a sketch with Catherine Tate who appeared in the guise of her character Elaine Figgis from The Catherine Tate Show. The sketch was made for the BBC Red Nose Day 2007 fundraising programme. In 2008, in addition to Quantum of Solace and its accompanying video game, Craig starred in the drama Flashbacks of a Fool alongside Emilia Fox, as a washed-up Hollywood actor who reflects on his life; although the film was received negatively, Craig's performance was praised. In his final release of 2008, the war film Defiance, Craig starred as Tuvia Bielski, the leader of the Bielski partisans, fighting in the forests of Belarus during World War II, saving 1,200 people.

He co-starred with Hugh Jackman in a limited engagement of the drama A Steady Rain, on Broadway, which played in autumn 2009 at the Schoenfeld Theatre, for which he gained positive reviews. In August 2010, Craig starred as crusading journalist Mikael Blomkvist in David Fincher's 2011 adaptation of Stieg Larsson's novel The Girl with the Dragon Tattoo. The next year, he took up a leading role in Dream House, a psychological thriller directed by Jim Sheridan and co-starring Rachel Weisz, Naomi Watts and Marton Csokas. It garnered mostly negative reviews and low box office results. Craig then co-starred with Harrison Ford and Olivia Wilde in Cowboys & Aliens, an American science fiction Western film, based on Scott Mitchell Rosenberg's 2006 graphic novel of the same name. The same year, Craig provided his voice to Steven Spielberg's animated film The Adventures of Tintin in 2011, playing the villainous pirate Ivan Ivanovitch Sakharine and his ancestor Red Rackham in a dual role.

The planned 19 April 2010 release of Craig's third Bond film was delayed, because of financial troubles; the film, titled Skyfall, was eventually released on 23 October 2012. The same year, he appeared as James Bond in the short film Happy and Glorious, in which he escorted Queen Elizabeth II to the 2012 Summer Olympics opening ceremony. He and his wife Weisz starred in a Broadway play titled Betrayal, which ran from October 2013 to January 2014. Despite mixed reviews, it grossed $17.5 million, becoming the second highest earning Broadway play of 2013. Craig's fourth Bond film, Spectre, began filming in December 2014 and was released on 26 October 2015. His first four Bond films have grossed $3.5 billion globally, after adjusting for inflation.

Prior to the inaugural Invictus Games held in London in September 2014, Craig, along with other entertainers and athletes, read the poem "Invictus" in a promotional video. He made an uncredited cameo appearance as a stormtrooper in the 2015 film Star Wars: The Force Awakens. Craig appeared in a modern production of William Shakespeare's tragedy Othello at the Off-Broadway New York Theatre Workshop throughout late 2016 and early 2017. The production starred David Oyelowo as the titular character and Craig as the main antagonist, Iago. Diane Snyder of The Daily Telegraph praised his "chilling" portrayal of Iago in the play. In 2017, Craig co-starred in Steven Soderbergh's comedy Logan Lucky, about two brothers who pull off a heist during a NASCAR race. Craig starred alongside Halle Berry in the drama Kings set during the 1992 Los Angeles riots. The film premiered in September 2017 and was distributed by the Orchard the following year; it was harshly reviewed by many film critics.

In 2019, Craig starred in Rian Johnson's black comedy murder-mystery Knives Out as Benoit Blanc, a detective investigating the sudden death of a family patriarch. It premiered at the 2019 Toronto International Film Festival to critical acclaim, and was theatrically released that November. In 2020, it was announced the Craig had signed on to reprise the character in an upcoming sequel. His fifth Bond film No Time to Die was to be directed by Danny Boyle and released in November 2019, but it was delayed after Boyle left the project. It was ultimately directed by Cary Joji Fukunaga and was released in cinemas from 30 September 2021 in the UK and in the US on 8 October 2021 having been delayed several times due to the COVID-19 pandemic.

In appearances on The Late Show with Stephen Colbert and The Graham Norton Show, Craig said that No Time to Die would be his last James Bond film. Two days before the film's release in the US, Craig was awarded a star on the Hollywood Walk of Fame which is located at 7007 Hollywood Boulevard (a reference to Bond's code number "007"), and next to the star of fellow Bond actor Roger Moore.

2022–present: Post-Bond work 
In 2022, Craig starred in a contemporary revival of Macbeth opposite Ruth Negga on Broadway. Variety described his performance writing "Craig has some strong moments but does not capture the transformation of Macbeth into a power-hungry tyrant." The Guardian Alexis Soloski rated the production 3/5, stating, "...Craig's burly Macbeth, clad handsomely in Suttirat Larlab's modern dress costumes, is every inch a man of action and a soldier, even in a silky bathrobe, entirely convincing in motion, less persuasive when zipping through Macbeth's equivocations."

Craig also starred in Glass Onion, the sequel to Knives Out. He has reportedly signed on for a third film, with Rian Johnson to direct again.

Charity and humanitarian work 

In 2007, Craig and British Prime Minister Tony Blair took part in the United Kingdom's Comic Relief charity fundraiser, ultimately raising more than USD $90 million. Craig made a cameo appearance as himself in a sketch with Catherine Tate who appeared in the guise of her character Elaine Figgis from The Catherine Tate Show, for the BBC Red Nose Day 2007 fundraising programme. Craig participated in the Broadway Cares/Equity Fights AIDS fundraising 8 December 2009, raising $1,549,953 in the 21st annual Gypsy of the Year competition, from six weeks of curtain appeals at their hit Broadway drama, A Steady Rain. Craig starred in 2011 in a short film narrated by Judi Dench, which was produced for International Woman's Day. The next year, Craig worked with Orbis International in Mongolia to raise support and awareness of the Orbis medical team and their Flying Eye Hospital.

He is involved with multiple charities including S.A.F.E. Kenya, which uses street theatre to address social issues. He is also involved with the Opportunity Network, which provides access to education for low-income students in New York. In 2011, he collaborated with Dame Judi Dench to highlight gender inequality for International Women's Day. In August 2014, he added his name to a letter to British broadcasters calling for better representation of ethnic minorities. In 2015, Craig appeared in the film Comic Relief: Behind the Bond for the BBC Red Nose Day 2015 fundraising programme.

In April 2015, the United Nations appointed Craig the first global advocate for the elimination of mines and explosive hazards. The role involves raising awareness for the UN Mine Action Service (UNMAS), and political and financial support for the cause. Former UN Secretary-General Ban Ki-moon told Craig: "You have been given a licence to kill, I'm now giving you a licence to save." In 2019, Craig appeared in a video with the Secretary-General of the United Nations, António Guterres, and launched the UNMAS Safe Ground campaign to turn minefields into playing fields.

Politics 
In 2012, Craig expressed a dislike and distrust for politics and politicians in general, being quoted as saying "Politicians are shitheads. That's how they become politicians, even the good ones. We're actors, we're artists, we're very nice to each other. They'll turn around and stab you in the fucking back". He has been particularly scathing about Tony Blair, going as far as comparing Blair's penchant for befriending celebrities to the book Mephisto. He also expressed a reluctance to involve himself with politicians, arguing that by doing so "you immediately are aligning yourself with a political party."

Craig supported Barack Obama in the 2008 and 2012 US presidential elections. He was outspoken about his opposition to Brexit before the 2016 EU membership referendum. In 2016, he was pictured wearing a "Vote Remain" t-shirt which was adorned with the words, "No man is an island. No country by itself."

Personal life 
In 1992, Craig married actress Fiona Loudon; they had a daughter before divorcing in 1994. He later began a relationship with German actress Heike Makatsch, which lasted for seven years. He subsequently dated film producer Satsuki Mitchell.

Craig and actress Rachel Weisz had known each other since working together on Les Grandes Horizontales (1994). They began dating in December 2010, and were married in a private ceremony in New York City on 22 June 2011 with only four guests in attendance, including Craig's daughter and Weisz's son. It was reported on 1 September 2018 that their first child together, a daughter, had been born.

In January 2018, Craig purchased a house in Brooklyn, New York, for an amount in excess of $6 million. He is an avid fan of Liverpool F.C., and is also a fan of rugby, having travelled to Australia in 2013 to watch the British and Irish Lions tour.

In 2019, Craig announced he had obtained an American citizenship.

Craig was appointed Companion of the Order of St Michael and St George (CMG) in the 2022 New Year Honours for services to film and theatre.

Filmography

Film

Television

Theatre

Video games

Commercials

Awards and nominations

See also 
 
 Outline of James Bond

References

Further reading

External links 

 
 
 
 
 
 Daniel Craig at GQ Magazine
 
 Detailed biography from Tiscali Film & TV
 
 Official James Bond 007 Website

1968 births
20th-century English male actors
21st-century English male actors
Actors from Chester
Alumni of the Guildhall School of Music and Drama
Audiobook narrators
Companions of the Order of St Michael and St George
English agnostics
English feminists
English male film actors
English male models
English male radio actors
English male stage actors
English male television actors
English male video game actors
English male voice actors
English people of French descent
English people of Welsh descent
Living people
Male actors from Cheshire
Male feminists
National Youth Theatre members
People educated at Calday Grange Grammar School
People from the Metropolitan Borough of Wirral
Royal Navy officers